Leander Jerry Shaw Jr. (September 6, 1930 – December 14, 2015) was an American jurist who served on the Florida Supreme Court from 1983 until 2003. He was chief justice from 1990 to 1992.

Born in Salem, Virginia, Shaw went to Lylburn Downing School in Lexington, Virginia. He graduated from West Virginia State University in 1952. He then served in the United States Army during the Korean War. In 1957, Shaw received his law degree from Howard University School of Law. In 1957, Shaw moved to Tallahassee, Florida and was a law professor at Florida A&M University. He was admitted to the Florida bar in 1960 and practiced law in Jacksonville, Florida. Shaw served on the Florida State Attorney staff in 1969. In 1972, Shaw was appointed to the Florida Industrial Relations Commission. From 1979 to 1983, Shaw served on the Florida District Courts of Appeal. Shaw served on the Florida Supreme Court from 1983 until 2003 and was chief justice of that court from 1990 to 1992. He also served as judge in residence at Washington and Lee University School of Law in Lexington, Virginia. Shaw died on December 14, 2015 in Tallahassee, Florida at the age of 85. at the home of his daughter after a lengthy illness. He is survived by his three daughters, son, and grandchildren

See also
List of African-American jurists

References

External links
Photograph of Leander J. Shaw Jr.

1930 births
2015 deaths
Chief Justices of the Florida Supreme Court
Judges of the Florida District Courts of Appeal
Florida A&M University faculty
Washington and Lee University School of Law faculty
People from Salem, Virginia
People from Jacksonville, Florida
People from Tallahassee, Florida
West Virginia State University alumni
Howard University School of Law alumni
United States Army officers
United States Army personnel of the Korean War
Justices of the Florida Supreme Court